Beth Nahrain; "between (two) rivers") is the name for the region known as Mesopotamia in the Syriac language. Geographically, it refers to the areas between and surrounding the Euphrates and Tigris rivers (as well as their tributaries). The Aramaic name also refers to the area around the rivers, not only literally between the rivers. The area is considered by Assyrians as their homeland.

This area roughly encompasses almost all of present-day Iraq, parts of southeastern Turkey, northwestern Iran, and, more recently, northeastern Syria. The Assyrians are considered to be indigenous inhabitants of Beth Nahrain. "Nahrainean" or "Nahrainian" is the Anglicized name for "Nahrāyā", which is the Aramaic equivalent of "Mesopotamian".

History

Etymology
While it may be thought that the name is calqued from Mesopotamia, the opposite is more probable. The Aramaic name has been attested since the adoption of Old Aramaic as the lingua franca of the Neo Assyrian Empire in the 8th century BCE, but the Greek name Mesopotamia was first coined in the 2nd century BCE by the historian Polybius during the Seleucid period. The name Bayn al-Nahrayn is also found in Arabic ("between the two rivers"). Other, less common Classical Syriac variants of the name include Bêṯ Nahrawwāṯā ("between the rivers") and Meṣʿaṯ Nahrawwāṯā ("the middle of the rivers").

Modern culture
The term "Beth Nahrain" is commonly used by both Eastern and Western Assyrians and acts as a united front for an autonomous Assyrian region. Political and military organizations have developed using the "Beth Nahrain" name, including:
 Bethnahrain Women's Protection Forces
 Bet-Nahrain Democratic Party
 Bethnahrin Patriotic Revolution Organization
 Bethnahrin Freedom Party

People

The Assyrians (also referred to as Syriacs, Arameans or Chaldeans) view themselves as the native people of Beth Nahrain. They speak different dialects of Neo-Aramaic depending on their geographical location within Beth Nahrain. Today, Assyrians in Iraq and Iran as well as the Khabur River Valley in Syria speak varieties of Northeastern Neo-Aramaic while the Assyrians in Turkey and Syria mainly speak Turoyo, a dialect of Central Neo-Aramaic.

Other prominent ethnic groups present in Beth Nahrain include Arabs, Armenians, Yazidis, Turkmen, Persians, Kurds and Turks.

Geography

Beth Nahrain occupies the land between two rivers - referring to the Euphrates and Tigris.

See also
Assyria
Assyrian continuity
Assyrian homeland
Fertile Crescent
Proposals for Assyrian autonomy in Iraq
Upper Mesopotamia

Notes

References

Divided regions
Cultural regions
Geographic history of Syria
Aramaic words and phrases
Assyrian geography

arc:ܒܝܬ ܢܗܪܝܢ